Yu Guijun (Chinese: 于贵君; Pinyin: Yú Guìjūn; born 15 April 1985) is a Chinese football player who currently plays for China League Two side Shenzhen Renren.

Club career
Yu was initially an amateur footballer and studied in Dandong No.2 Middle School. He was scouted by Shenyang Ginde youth team coach in 2002 when he had a wonderful performance in the Liaoning Provincial Sports Games. He began to receive professional football training from July 2002 and was promoted to first team squad in 2004. On 2 May 2004, Yu made his senior debut in the first leg of the second round in the 2004 Chinese FA Cup and scored his first senior goal in the first half as Shenyang Ginde beat Shaanxi Guoli 2–1. He continued to score in the second leg on 6 May, helping Shenyang Ginde to advance to the third round. Having a promising performance in the FA Cup, Yu became a regular starter and made his league debut on 16 May, in a 0–0 home draw against Shenzhen Jianlibao. He scored his first league goal in the third league appearance on 26 May, which Shenyang Ginde were beaten by Beijing Hyundai 4–1. Yu scored 3 goals in 19 appearances in the Super League and 4 goals in the FA Cup in his debut season.

Yu made stable appearances in the next few seasons and followed the club to move to Changsha in 2007. Changsha Ginde finished the bottom in the 2010 league season and relegation to China League One. In February 2011, the club moved to Shenzhen as the club's name changed into Shenzhen Phoenix, Yu chose to stay in the club.  The club were bought by Chinese property developers Guangzhou R&F and moved to Guangzhou in June and won promotion back to the Super League at the first attempt. Yu made 17 appearances and scored 2 goals in the 2011 league season.
On 21 July 2013, Yu was loaned to China League Two side Qingdao Hainiu until 31 December.

In 2015, Yu signed for Shenzhen Renren.

Career statistics 
Statistics accurate as of match played 13 October 2018.

References

1985 births
Living people
Chinese footballers
Association football forwards
Sportspeople from Dandong
Footballers from Liaoning
Changsha Ginde players
Guangzhou City F.C. players
Qingdao F.C. players
Chinese Super League players
China League One players